Drywood Township is a township in Vernon County, in the U.S. state of Missouri.

Drywood Township was erected in 1855, taking its name from Dry Wood Creek.

References

Townships in Missouri
Townships in Vernon County, Missouri